

About
New Ross RFC is an Irish rugby team based in New Ross, County Wexford, playing in Division 2A of the Leinster League.

Along with fielding competitive Men's J1 and J2 teams weekly (along with a 3rd team for competing in the Anderson Cup [Provincial J3]), New Ross also has a ladies team and a highly successful underage section – ranging from U-8's all the way up to Youths. This youth section has provided the club with both Provincial and International representation.

New Ross RFC is the home club of current Irish International Tadhg Furlong. Tadhg played rugby in New Ross from minis up to under 19's. In 2010 he helped New Ross win the Leinster League premier division, playing on a team that also included 3 time All Ireland winning hurler Walter Walsh.

Leinster League history

2019/2020 - Finished 3rd in LL Division 2B

2018/2019 - Relegated from LL Division 2A

2017/2018 – Finished 6th in division 2A

2016/2017 – Winners of Leinster League division 2B

2015/2016 – Relegated from LL division 2A

2014/2015 – Finished 5th in LL Division 2A

2013/2014 – Winners of Division Leinster League division 2B

2012/2013 – Relegated from LL Division 2A

2011/2012 – Finished 5th in LL Division 2A

2010/2011 – Relegated from LL Division 1B

2009/2010 – Finished 4th in Division 1B

2008/2009 – Division Two – Runner-Up (Promoted)

2007/2008 – Division Two – 10th

2006/2007 – Division Two – 8th

2001/2002 – Division Three – 1st (Promoted)

1997/1998 – Division Two – (Relegated)

Leinster Towns Cup

2008/2009
 2nd Round – 8 March 2009 – Clane   21–6  New Ross
 1st Round – 24 January 2009 – New Ross 39–14 Arklow

Notable players

Internationals
 Tadhg Furlong

Irish Youths
 Richie Bolger
 Kieran Moloney
 Tadhg Furlong
 John Sutton

Irish Students
 Gary Conway
Mick Power

Leinster Youths
 Richie Bolger
 Kieran Moloney
 Tadgh  Furlong
 John Sutton
 Robert Vallejo 
 Johnny Foley
 Patrick Dunne

Footnotes

References
 "Leinster club contacts page" 
 "New Ross Rugby Club Official Website"
 "Leinster League Division 2 Table"

Irish rugby union teams
Rugby clubs established in 1970
Rugby union clubs in County Wexford
Sport in New Ross